Bristol Bay Borough is a borough of the U.S. state of Alaska on Bristol Bay. As of the 2020 census the borough population was 844, down from 997 in 2010, the second-least populated borough in Alaska. The borough seat is Naknek. There are no incorporated settlements.

Incorporated in 1962, Bristol Bay was the first of Alaska's boroughs. It is also among the smallest, consisting of little more than the rectangle of land around Naknek on the coast and King Salmon (which, uniquely, serves as the borough seat for the neighboring Lake and Peninsula Borough) inland.

Geography

Adjacent boroughs and census areas
 Lake and Peninsula Borough, Alaska (east, north and south)
 Dillingham Census Area, Alaska (west)

National protected area
 Katmai National Park and Preserve (part)
 Katmai Wilderness (part)

Demographics

At the 2000 census there were 1,258 people, 490 households, and 300 families residing in the borough.  The population density was 2 people per square mile (1/km2). There were 979 housing units at an average density of 2 per square mile (1/km2).  The racial makeup of the borough was 52.54% White, 0.56% Black or African American, 43.72% Native American, 0.24% Asian, 0.48% Pacific Islander, 0.08% from other races, and 2.38% from two or more races.  0.56%. were Hispanic or Latino of any race.

Of the 490 households 38.20% had children under the age of 18 living with them, 49.20% were married couples living together, 6.10% had a female householder with no husband present, and 38.60% were non-families. 31.20% of households were one person and 2.90% were one person aged 65 or older.  The average household size was 2.57 and the average family size was 3.33.

The age distribution was 31.30% under the age of 18, 5.90% from 18 to 24, 34.80% from 25 to 44, 24.20% from 45 to 64, and 3.80% 65 or older.  The median age was 36 years. For every 100 females, there were 119.50 males.  For every 100 females age 18 and over, there were 125.60 males.

Communities
The Bristol Bay Borough has no incorporated cities. There are three census-designated places, corresponding to the borough's three population centers: King Salmon, Naknek and South Naknek.  While these CDPs do not cover the borough's land mass, they contain 100 percent of the borough's population, per the 2010 Census.

Politics

See also

List of airports in the Bristol Bay Borough
National Register of Historic Places listings in Bristol Bay Borough, Alaska

References

External links
 
  

 
1962 establishments in Alaska
Populated places established in 1962